Chordodea is an order of worms belonging to the class Gordioida.

Families:
 Chordodidae
 Chordodiolinidae
 Parachordodidae
 Paragordiidae

References

Nematomorpha